Kranich is a German language surname with the meaning crane. Notable people with the surname include:
 Burchard Kranich (1515–1578), German mining engineer 
 Heiki Kranich (1961), Estonian politician
 Jami Kranich (1992), American soccer coach
 Nancy C. Kranich, American librarian
 Ursula Groden-Kranich (1965), German politician

German-language surnames
Surnames from nicknames